Eagan is an unincorporated community in Claiborne County and Campbell County, Tennessee, in the Cumberland Mountains of the southeastern United States.  It lies along State Route 90 just west of Clairfield in the Clearfork Valley.  A former coal mining town, Eagan was likely named for either a mining company official or a minister.

Eagan is home to several small business, churches, and a community center, the Clearfork Community Institute.  It also has its own post office, with ZIP code 37730.

References

External links

Clearfork Community Institute

Unincorporated communities in Campbell County, Tennessee
Unincorporated communities in Claiborne County, Tennessee
Unincorporated communities in Tennessee